Gowrie Park is a rural locality in the local government area (LGA) of Kentish in the North-west and west LGA region of Tasmania. The 2016 census recorded a population of 32 for the state suburb of Gowrie Park.

History 
Gowrie Park was gazetted as a locality in 1957. The name is believed to have come from the farm of an early settler.

Geography
The Dasher River flows through from south-west to north.

Road infrastructure 
Route C136 (Claude Road) passes through from north to south.

References

Towns in Tasmania
Localities of Kentish Council